Forrester's paradox, also known as the paradox of gentle murder, is a paradox of deontic logic attributed to James Forrester. It is a version of the Good Samaritan paradox.

Forrester's argument is that, starting from the statements that

 It is obligatory (under the law) that Smith not murder Jones.
 It is obligatory that, if Smith murders Jones, Smith murder Jones gently.

it logically follows that:

 If Smith murders Jones, it is obligatory, that Smith murder Jones gently.

However, if it were actually the case that Smith murdered Jones, it can then be deduced that:

 It is obligatory, that Smith murder Jones

which contradicts the first statement, leading to a logical fallacy.

A number of arguments have been advanced that Forrester's paradox is invalid, for example that it is the result of a confusion of scope, or a misuse of deduction rules.

References 

Paradoxes
Philosophical logic